Buckeye is an unincorporated community in Pocahontas County, West Virginia, United States. As of mid 2021, US post office now open. Town has large used bookstore, c-store, farm supply, and access to Greenbrier trail and Greenbrier River. Home of Louise McNeill, former poet laureate of WV. La in Buckeye.

The community takes its name from nearby Buckeye Cove.

Climate
The climate in this area has mild differences between highs and lows, and there is adequate rainfall year-round.  According to the Köppen Climate Classification system, Buckeye has a marine west coast climate, abbreviated "Cfb" on climate maps. Buckeye holds the October record low of 3 for the state of West Virginia.

References

Unincorporated communities in Pocahontas County, West Virginia
Unincorporated communities in West Virginia